Fábio da Rocha Aguiar (born 7 December 1983) is a Brazilian born Portuguese futsal player who plays as a winger for Minerva and the Portugal national team.

References

External links

1983 births
Living people
Brazilian men's futsal players
Portuguese men's futsal players
C.F. Os Belenenses futsal players
Instituto D. João V players
Sporting CP futsal players
Footballers from Rio de Janeiro (city)
Brazilian footballers